According to Ayyavazhi mythology there are Seven Logas (Seven Upper Worlds). The Sanskrit term for Loga is "loka." Akilam six and Akilam seven of Akilattirattu Ammanai speaks about it. The Seven logas are;

 Deivaloka (the Sanskrit term for deiva loga is Devaloka)
 Yamaloka
 Swarga Loga (the Sanskrit term for Swarga Loga is Svarga)
 Brahmaloka
 Vaikunth (the Sanskrit term for Vaikunda Loga is Vaikunta)
 Sivaloka (the Sanskrit term for Siva Loga is Sivaloka or Kailasa)
 Paraloka

See also
 Brahmapura
 Sri Yantra

Ayyavazhi mythology